Rehema Ellis is an American television journalist, working for NBC News. A correspondent based in New York City, New York, she is also the lead education correspondent for NBC News.

Early life and education
Ellis was born in North Carolina, and raised in Boston, Massachusetts.

Ellis graduated from both Simmons College, located in Boston; and the Columbia University Graduate School of Journalism, located in New York City.

Career

Early career
Ellis worked at several television stations before joining NBC News. Ellis began her broadcasting career at KDKA-TV and Radio in Pittsburgh, Pennsylvania, and she has also worked at WHDH-TV in Boston as an anchor and reporter.

NBC News
Ellis joined NBC News in 1994 as a general assignment reporter. During her more than twenty-year career with NBC News she has reported on a wide range of topics, including Hurricane Katrina in 2005; the plane crash on the Hudson River in 2009; the 2008 presidential election; the September 11 attacks on the World Trade Center in 2001; mass killings in Zaire; the death of Michael Jackson in 2009; and the 2004 Summer Olympic Games in Greece.

In 2010, Ellis became lead education correspondent where she reports on educational topics and is the main correspondent for the NBC Education Nation summit.

Awards and honors
Ellis has won numerous Emmy Awards, Associated Press awards, Edward R. Murrow Awards, and the National Association of Black Journalists awards.

See also

 List of Columbia University Graduate School of Journalism people
 List of people from Boston
 List of people from New York City
 List of people from North Carolina

References

External links 
 NBC's Bio of Ellis
 

Year of birth missing (living people)
Place of birth missing (living people)
20th-century births
20th-century African-American women
20th-century African-American people
21st-century American women
21st-century women
African-American women journalists
African-American journalists
American reporters and correspondents
Columbia University Graduate School of Journalism alumni
Journalists from Massachusetts
Journalists from New York City
Journalists from North Carolina
Living people
NBC News people
People from Boston
Pittsburgh television reporters
Simmons University alumni
American women television journalists
21st-century African-American women
21st-century African-American people